Carleton is a provincial riding in Ontario, Canada. It was created in 1867 at the time of confederation and lasted until provincial redistribution in 1996. In the 1999 provincial election it was redistributed into Nepean—Carleton and Lanark—Carleton. In 2007 it was abolished into Carleton—Mississippi Mills and Lanark—Frontenac—Lennox and Addington.

In 2018 it was re-created as the riding of Carleton from parts of Nepean—Carleton, Carleton—Mississippi Mills and Ottawa South.

Boundaries
For the last three elections when Carleton existed (1987, 1990 and 1995) the riding included the municipalities of West Carleton Township, Goulbourn Township, Rideau Township, Osgoode Township and the City of Kanata. It was abolished in 1999 into Nepean—Carleton and Lanark—Carleton. The riding was re-created by the 2012 electoral redistribution from parts of Nepean—Carleton (59%), Carleton—Mississippi Mills (41%) and a small portion of Ottawa South.

Members of Provincial Parliament

Electoral results (2018–)

Election results, Lanark—Carleton (1999-2007)

References

External links 
Map of riding for 2018 election

Ontario provincial electoral districts
Provincial electoral districts of Ottawa